Dyngö is a small island in the archipelago of Sweden's west coast, located in the province (landskap) of Bohuslän, near the village Fjällbacka. Formerly a fishing community, the island now has few or no permanent inhabitants, hosting instead a number of summer residents. In the 1950s one prominent summer resident was Per Nyström, the then county governor of the provinces of Bohuslän and Gothenburg.

References

Islands of Västra Götaland County
Bohuslän
Islands on the Swedish West Coast